His Honour Willoughby Jardine KC (29 October 1879 – 15 October 1945), was a British Judge and Liberal Party politician.

Background
Jardine was born the eldest son of James Jardine, KC. He was educated at Eton School and King's College, Cambridge. In 1910 he married Lettice Joyce Sutton. They had three sons and one daughter. One of his sons was senior civil servant Christopher Willoughby Jardine.

Professional career
Jardine was appointed as a King's Counsel in 1927. He served as Solicitor-General of the County Palatine of Durham, from 1932–39 and Attorney-General of the County Palatine of Durham, from 1939–40. He was a Judge of Bow County Courts from 1940-45.

Political career
Jardine was Liberal candidate for the Whitby division of the North Riding of Yorkshire at the January 1910 General Election. He was Liberal candidate for the Maldon division of Essex at the December 1910 General Election. He did not stand for parliament again.

Electoral record

References

1879 births
1945 deaths
Liberal Party (UK) parliamentary candidates
People educated at Eton College
Alumni of King's College, Cambridge
Members of the Inner Temple